The Prize for Innovation in Distributed Computing (also called SIROCCO award) is an award presented annually at the conference International Colloquium on Structural Information and Communication Complexity (SIROCCO) to a living individual (or individuals) who have made a major contribution to understanding "the relationships between information and efficiency in decentralized computing", which is main area of interest for this conference. The award recognizes innovation, in particular, it recognizes inventors of new ideas that were unorthodox and outside the mainstream at the time of their introduction. There are two restrictions for being eligible for this award: (1) The original contribution must have appeared in a publication at least five years before the year of the award, (2) One of the articles related to this contribution and authored by this candidate must have appeared in the proceedings of SIROCCO.

The award was presented for the first time in 2009.

Winners

See also 

 List of computer science awards

References

External links 
 SIROCCO Website 

Academic awards
Computer science awards
Distributed computing